Kogel mogel ( gogl-mogl; ; ; ;  gogol-mogol) is an egg-based homemade dessert once popular in parts of Europe and the Caucasus. It is made from egg yolks, sugar, and flavourings such as honey, vanilla, cocoa or rum, similar to eggnog or zabaione. In its classic form it is served slightly chilled or at room temperature. Served warm or hot, it is considered a home remedy for sore throats. Variations include milk, honey and soda.

History and etymology
Kogel mogel became known by this name by the 17th-century Jewish communities of Central Europe. It may have its roots in the Jewish code of law called the Shulchan Arukh where one is allowed to consume sweet syrup and/or raw egg on Shabbat to make one's voice more pleasant.

Vasmer's dictionary mentions different hypotheses on the origin of the name such as English hug-mug, hugger-mugger, or German Kuddelmuddel.

The dessert was made popular during the communist era food shortages, including sugar. It is still eaten in Norway, Poland and in Polish communities around the world.

Preparation
The dish consists of raw egg yolks and sugar, beaten and ground until they form a creamy texture, with no discernible grains of sugar. In modern kitchens, it is often mixed in a blender until it changes color and becomes thick. A classic single gogl-mogl portion is made from two egg yolks and three teaspoons of sugar beat into a cream-like dish. Variations can be made by adding chocolate, vodka, rum, honey, vanilla, lemon juice, orange juice, raisins, whipped cream, or a number of other ingredients based on one's own taste preferences.

Uses
Kogel mogel is often prepared as a transition food for babies moving from a cereal diet to one that includes eggs and other soft foods. It is also a folk medicine used for treating colds or flu, particularly chest colds and laryngitis. Kogel mogel is ranked highly among other traditional cold remedies such as chicken soup. 

The traditional usage of kogel mogel as a home remedy for treating a sore throat is supported by research done in Israel. The simplest form of preparation as a remedy is with no egg, but only honey added to warm milk.  More commonly, a single raw egg is added to a cup of warm milk and mixed with a tablespoon of honey.

Cultural references
In the German translation of Lewis Carroll's Alice's Adventures in Wonderland, Humpty Dumpty is called Goggelmoggel.

In the 1985 film of Doctor Aybolit from the Soviet Union, Doctor Aybolit nurses sick pirates and animals back to health by giving them kogel mogel.

 is a Polish 1988 comedy of manners film directed by Roman Załuski, starring Grażyna Błęcka-Kolska and Ewa Kasprzyk.

A similar sounding phrase, Great Googly Moogly, an apparent euphemism for "Great God Almighty,", appears in a Howlin' Wolf song, "Goin' Down Slow", and in the work of Langston Hughes, and was later more generally popularized by Frank Zappa and Mr. Magoo.

The kogel mogel appears as a central object of a scene in the 2006 Polish film We're All Christs directed by Marek Koterski.

See also

 
Eggnog

References

Custard desserts
Ashkenazi Jewish cuisine
Mixed drinks
Traditional medicine
Armenian cuisine
Iranian desserts
Polish desserts
Russian desserts
Ukrainian cuisine